The Hammonton Public Schools are a comprehensive community public school district that serve students in kindergarten through twelfth grade from Hammonton, in Atlantic County, New Jersey, United States.

As of the 2018–19 school year, the district, comprising four schools, had an enrollment of 3,566 students and 249.7 classroom teachers (on an FTE basis), for a student–teacher ratio of 14.3:1.

The district is classified by the New Jersey Department of Education as being in District Factor Group "B", the second lowest of eight groupings. District Factor Groups organize districts statewide to allow comparison by common socioeconomic characteristics of the local districts. From lowest socioeconomic status to highest, the categories are A, B, CD, DE, FG, GH, I and J.

Students from Folsom Borough (grades 9-12) and Waterford Township in Camden County (7-12) attend the Hammonton schools as part of sending/receiving relationships with the Folsom Borough School District and the Waterford Township School District.

History
In November 1999, residents of Hammonton approved a referendum on construction of new schools. In 2001, the construction of the Early Childhood Education Center was completed. The new Hammonton High School building  on Old Forks Road welcomed its first classes when it was opened in September 2002, having been constructed at a cost of $28.7 million of which 40% was funded by the state. The old high school building was converted to a middle school, allowing the district to accommodate the 700 students from Waterford Township who comprised a majority of the district's enrollment. The former high school was on Liberty Street, now home to Hammonton Middle school. Before the move, Hammonton Middle School was located on Vine Street, at a building that is now St. Joseph High School.

In the wake of the dissolution of the Lower Camden County Regional School District, the Hammonton board of education voted in 1999 to begin accepting an estimated 800 students from Waterford Township for grades 7-12 starting as of 2002, with the tuition paid by students from Waterford helping to lower overall costs to Hammonton taxpayers.

Schools
Schools in the district (with 2018–19 enrollment data from the National Center for Education Statistics) are:
Elementary schools
Early Childhood Education Center with 355 students in grades K-1
Darla Salay, Principal
Warren E. Sooy Elementary School with 873 students in grades 2-5
Kristina Erman, Principal
Damiso Josey, Assistant Principal 
Middle school
Hammonton Middle School with 879 students in grades 6-8
Michael Nolan, Principal
Kevin Clements, Assistant Principal
High school
Hammonton High School with 1,393 students in grades 9-12
Thomas Ramsay, Principal 
Jeffrey Hinson, Assistant Principal
Dr. Kimberly Rudnesky, Assistant Principal

Administration
Core members of the district's administration are:
Robin Chieco, Superintendent
Barbara S. Prettyman, Business Administrator / Board Secretary

In 2020 Hammonton Public Schools acquired the former St. Joseph High School building, which it leased to the independent St. Joseph Academy.

Board of education
The district's board of education, with nine members, sets policy and oversees the fiscal and educational operation of the district through its administration. As a Type II school district, the board's trustees are elected directly by voters to serve three-year terms of office on a staggered basis, with three seats up for election each year held (since 2012) as part of the November general election. The board appoints a superintendent to oversee the day-to-day operation of the district. Representatives are appointed to represent Folsom and Waterford Township on the Hammonton board of education.

References

External links
Hammonton Public Schools

School Data for the Hammonton Public Schools, National Center for Education Statistics

Hammonton, New Jersey
New Jersey District Factor Group B
School districts in Atlantic County, New Jersey